William Ash was an American professional basketball player. He played for the Chicago American Gears in the National Basketball League for two games in the 1944–45 season and averaged 5.0 points per game.

References

Year of birth unknown
Year of death unknown
American men's basketball players
Chicago American Gears players